East Delta University ( or EDU) is a private university in Chittagong, Bangladesh. It received the government's license in 2006 and started its academic operation in February 2008.

East Delta University is approved by the Government of Bangladesh as well as the Bangladesh University Grants Commission (UGC) under the nation's private university rules. It is a not for profit university.

The university is governed by the East Delta University Trust, a subsidiary of Chittagong Foundation, an independent and non-partisan social welfare organization.

Programs offered
The university will limit itself to offering four-year bachelor's degree in a limited number of subjects along with its major focus on Master of Business Administration, MA in English and MSc/MPPL taught by distinguished international faculties.

English is the medium of instruction.

School of Business

Department of Business Administration
 Bachelor of Business Administration (BBA)
 Master of Business Administration (MBA)*

Department of Digitalization, Innovation and Entrepreneurship
 MSc in Data Analytics and Design Thinking for Business

Department of Public Leadership, Management and Governance
 Master of Public Policy and Leadership (MPPL)

Under the unique agreement signed between EDU and Central Michigan University, Michigan, EDU's MBA students from 2012 can opt to transfer their credits to CMU and finish the remaining credits, i.e., at least 24 credit hours at CMU, at the end of their first year.

Membership
 Member of Association to Advance Collegiate Schools of Business
 Member of AMBA Development Network
 Member of Association of Management Development Institutions in South Asia

School of Liberal Arts and Social Science

Department of Economics
 Bachelor of Arts (Hons.) in Economics

Department of English
 Bachelor of Arts (Hons.) in English
 Master of Arts in English

School of Science, Engineering & Technology

Department of Computer Science & Engineering
 Bachelor of Science in Computer Science & Engineering (CSE)
 Bachelor of Science in Computer Science & Engineering (CSE-Evening)
 Master of Science in Computer Science & Engineering (M.Sc. in CSE)

Department of Electrical & Electronic Engineering
 Bachelor of Science in Electrical & Electronic Engineering (EEE)
 Bachelor of Science in Electrical & Electronic Engineering (EEE-Evening)

Department of Electronic & Telecommunication Engineering
 Bachelor of Science in Electronic & Telecommunication Engineering (ETE)
 Bachelor of Science in Electronic & Telecommunication Engineering (ETE-Evening)
 Master of Science in Electronic & Telecommunication Engineering (M.Sc. in ETE)

Professional and other bodies

Center for Professional Development and Change (CPDC) 

 Post Graduate Diploma in Human Resource Management (PGDHRM)
 Advanced Certificate in Financial Technology (ACF)

Academic Support Clinic 

The academic support clinic is a university educational unit with the mission of providing academic assistance to students to a limited extent in their academic advancement, as well as academic services that require and benefit from a variety of academic disciplinary perspectives.

Access Academy 

For students enrolled in East Delta University's undergraduate program, Access Academy is a credit-required curriculum. Three-credit courses are available at the academy. These courses must be taken and passed, but grades will not be factored into the final CGPA. This program consists of three courses that focus on the many abilities (personal and academic) that a student may possess. In their first year at EDU, students will take Access Academy courses to prepare them for their future academic and professional lives. Students will be accredited Access Academy alumni after completing prescribed courses.

IEEE EDU Student Brunch 

STB11437 (East Delta University), Type: Student Branch 

A part of the world's largest technical professional organization dedicated to the advancement of technology for the common good.

Grading System

Semesters

 Spring semester (January – April)
 Summer semester (May – August)
 Fall semester (September – December)

References

External links
 East Delta University
 EDU SCHOOL OF SCIENCE, ENGINEERING & TECHNOLOGY
 EDU SCHOOL OF BUSINESS ADMINISTRATION
 EDU SCHOOL OF LIBERAL ARTS & SOCIAL SCIENCE
 CENTER FOR PROFESSIONAL DEVELOPMENT & CHANGE
 East Delta University Journals
 Publons, Web of Science

Private universities in Bangladesh
Universities and colleges in Chittagong
Educational institutions established in 2006
2006 establishments in Bangladesh